KBIS may refer to:

 The ICAO code for Bismarck Municipal Airport
 KBIS-LD, a low-power television station (channel 4, virtual 38) licensed to serve Turlock, California, United States
 KFKB, a radio station (1490 AM) licensed to Forks, Washington, United States, which held the call sign KBIS from 2005 to 2011
 Kitchen/Bath Industry Show & Conference